Wasfi Kabha (1958/9 – November 2021) was a Palestinian politician. He was Minister of Prisoners' Affairs of the Palestinian National Authority in the Palestinian Government of March 2006 and is one of the most prominent leaders of the Islamic movement in the West Bank.  and Minister of State in Palestinian National Unity Government of March 2007.

After the Hamas takeover of the Gaza Strip in 2007, President Mahmoud Abbas acquitted all Hamas cabinet members including Kabha, who was replaced by Ashraf al-Ajrami.

Israeli detention 
Wasfi Kabha was kidnapped by the Israeli authorities in June 2006, along with other Hamas ministers and parliament members in a clampdown against their organization. During his eleven-day detainment he claimed being abused by interrogators.

On 21 May 2015, he was released by the Israeli authorities after spending 10 months in administrative detention.

Death 
Kabha died of complications from COVID-19 in Barta'a in November 2021, at the age of 69.

See also 
2006 Gaza conflict
Nasser al-Shaer

Notes 

1950s births
Year of birth uncertain
2021 deaths
Hamas members
Government ministers of the Palestinian National Authority
State ministers of Palestine
Deaths from the COVID-19 pandemic in the State of Palestine